Patrick Sarsfield, 1st Earl of Lucan (born c.1655 – 21 August 1693), was an Irish soldier, and leading figure in the Jacobite army during the 1689 to 1691 Williamite War in Ireland. 

Born into a wealthy Catholic family, Sarsfield joined a regiment recruited by James Scott, Duke of Monmouth for the 1672 to 1674 Third Anglo-Dutch War, a subsidiary of the Franco-Dutch War. After England made peace, his regiment served in the French Rhineland campaign, and when the war ended in 1678, he returned to England. Following the so-called Popish Plot, Catholics were barred from the English military, and for the next few years Sarsfield led a precarious life on the fringes of London society.

When the Catholic James II came to the throne in 1685, Sarsfield served as a volunteer during Monmouth's Rebellion, and was commissioned into the Royal Army. A colonel by the time of the Glorious Revolution in November 1688, he remained loyal to James and followed him into exile in France. He returned to Ireland in March 1689 as a senior commander in the Jacobite army and was elected to the short-lived Patriot Parliament. 

As leader of the "War Party", by late 1690 he largely controlled Jacobite military strategy and was given the title Earl of Lucan. Their position became hopeless after Aughrim in July, and Sarsfield helped negotiate the 1691 Treaty of Limerick ending the war. It included an agreement under which thousands of Irish soldiers went into exile in France, later known as the "Flight of the Wild Geese". Many served in the Nine Years' War, including Sarsfield, who was killed at the Battle of Landen in 1693. 

While contemporaries universally acknowledged his courage, opinions of his judgement and intelligence were mixed. Nevertheless, his reputation and death meant in the 19th and early 20th centuries, he was widely commemorated in Ireland and among the international Irish diaspora as a military hero.

Biography
Originally of English descent, the Sarsfield family were wealthy Roman Catholic merchants, who settled in Dublin; Sir William Sarsfield was knighted in 1566, reportedly for providing the Crown financial support during Shane O'Neill's rebellion. He purchased Lucan Manor, a large estate now a suburb of Dublin, and Tully Commandery in County Kildare. 

Sarsfield's father Patrick (c. 1628 – after 1693) married Anne O'Moore, daughter of Rory O'Moore, a Gaelic noble who played a leading part in the 1641 rebellion. This was emphasised by 19th-century writers seeking to bolster Sarsfield's status as an Irish hero, although nationalist historian O'Callaghan claimed he was "no better than a puffed Palesman", compared to figures such as Eoghan Ruadh Ó Néill.

During the 1641 to 1652 Irish Confederate Wars, his father fought for the Catholic Confederacy but belonged to the moderate faction that sought an agreement with Protestant Irish Royalists. Although his estates were confiscated in 1652, they were returned in 1662. His eldest son William married Mary Crofts, reputedly an illegitimate daughter of Charles II and younger sister of James Scott, Duke of Monmouth.

In 1689, Sarsfield married the 15-year-old Honora Burke (1674–1698), daughter of William Burke, 7th Earl of Clanricarde; they had one son, James Sarsfield, 2nd Earl of Lucan (1693–1719). After Sarsfield's death, she married James FitzJames, 1st Duke of Berwick, eldest but illegitimate son of James II of England. 

Catalina Sarsfield, who styled herself Queen of the brief-lived Kingdom of Corsica, is often cited as Sarsfield's daughter. She was in fact a distant cousin; her father David Sarsfield came from another branch of the family, and was killed at the Battle of Villaviciosa in 1710.

Early career: France and England
 
There are few surviving records of Sarsfield's early life, although it is generally agreed he was brought up on the family estates at Tully. While some biographies claim he was educated at a French military college, there is no evidence for this.

In the 1670 Treaty of Dover, Charles II agreed to support a French attack on the Dutch Republic, and supply a brigade of 6,000 troops for the French army. When the Franco-Dutch War began in 1672, Sarsfield was commissioned into Monmouth's regiment, which formed part of this unit. When England left the war in 1674, the Brigade continued to serve in the Rhineland, under Turenne; Sarsfield transferred into a regiment commanded by Irish Catholic Sir George Hamilton. 

Sarsfield fought in the battles of Entzheim, Turckheim and Altenheim; he and Hamilton were standing next to Turenne when he was killed by a chance shot at Salzbach in July 1675. He remained in France until the war ended in 1678, then returned to London to join a new regiment being recruited by the Earl of Limerick; he was caught up in the Popish Plot, and like other Catholics barred from serving in the military. 

Having lost his career, he was often short of money and became involved in an expensive legal campaign to regain Lucan Manor from the heirs of his brother William, who died in 1675. This ultimately proved unsuccessful amid allegations of forged documents, and in 1681 he returned to London, where he made two separate attempts to abduct an heiress and was lucky to escape prosecution. Restored to favour when Charles's Catholic brother James became king in 1685, Sarsfield helped suppress the Monmouth Rebellion; he was unhorsed and "wounded in several places" at the decisive Battle of Sedgemoor. As James was keen to promote Catholics, this revitalised his military career, and by 1688 he was colonel of a cavalry unit.

After Richard Talbot, 1st Earl of Tyrconnell, was appointed Lord Deputy of Ireland in 1687, he began creating a Catholic-dominated Irish army and political establishment. Aware of preparations for invasion by his nephew and son-in-law William of Orange, James sent Sarsfield to Dublin in September to persuade Tyrconnell to provide him with Irish troops. This proved unsuccessful, and in November James was deposed by the Glorious Revolution. Sarsfield took part in the Wincanton Skirmish, one of the few military actions during the invasion; he remained in England until January when he was allowed to join James in France.

Williamite War in Ireland
 
Accompanied by French troops and English exiles, James landed in Ireland in March 1689, beginning the Williamite War in Ireland. Sarsfield was promoted brigadier, elected to the 1689 Irish Parliament for Dublin County, and commanded cavalry units in the campaign in Ulster and Connacht. When an Irish brigade was sent to France in October, French ambassador D'Avaux proposed Sarsfield as its commander. He noted that while "not...of noble birth [...], (he) has distinguished himself by his ability, and (his) reputation in this kingdom is greater than that of any man I know [...] He is brave, but above all has a sense of honour and integrity in all that he does".

James rejected this, stating that although unquestionably brave, Sarsfield was 'very scantily supplied with brains.' His role at the Boyne was peripheral, although the battle was less decisive than often assumed, Jacobite losses being around 2,000 from a force of 25,000. James returned to France, leaving Tyrconnell in control; he was the leader of the "Peace Party", who wanted to negotiate a settlement preserving Catholic rights to land and public office. Sarsfield headed the "War Party", who felt they could gain more by fighting on; it included the Luttrell brothers, Nicholas Purcell and English Catholic William Dorrington, a former colleague from Monmouth's Regiment. 

The position of the War Party was strengthened by the Declaration of Finglas, which offered the rank and file amnesty but excluded senior officers. French victories in the Low Countries briefly increased hopes of a Stuart restoration, and the Jacobites established a defensive line along the Shannon. Sarsfield cemented his reputation with an attack on the Williamite artillery train at Ballyneety, widely credited with forcing them to abandon the siege of Limerick. The Jacobites also retained Athlone, offset by the loss of Kinsale and Cork, which made resupply from France extremely difficult.

With Tyrconnell absent in France, Sarsfield took control and in December 1690, arrested several leaders of the peace faction. He then bypassed James by asking Louis XIV direct for French support, and requesting the removal of Tyrconnell and the army commander Berwick, James' illegitimate son. The latter, who later described Sarsfield as "a man [...] without sense", albeit "very good-natured", left Limerick for France in February.

Tyrconnell returned in January 1691, carrying letters from James making Sarsfield Earl of Lucan, an attempt to placate an "increasingly influential and troublesome figure". A large French convoy arrived at Limerick in May, along with St Ruth, appointed military commander in an attempt to end the conflict between the factions. St Ruth and 7,000 others died at Aughrim in July, reputedly the bloodiest battle ever on Irish soil. Sarsfield's role is unclear: one account claims he quarrelled with St Ruth, and was sent to the rear with the cavalry reserves. 

The remnants of the Jacobite army regrouped at Limerick; Tyrconnell died of a stroke in August, and in October, Sarsfield negotiated terms of surrender. He has been criticised for this, having constantly attacked Tyrconnell for advocating the same thing, while it is suggested the Williamite army was weaker than he judged. However, the collapse of the Shannon line and surrender of Galway and Sligo left him little option; without French supplies, the military position was hopeless, and defections meant his army was dissolving. 

The military articles of the Treaty of Limerick preserved the Jacobite army by allowing its remaining troops to enter French service; about 19,000 officers and men, including Sarsfield, chose to leave in what is known as the Flight of the Wild Geese. Sarsfield's handling of the civil articles was less successful; most of its protections were ignored by the new regime, although Sarsfield may have viewed it as temporary, hoping to resume the war.

Exile and death
On arrival in France, Sarsfield became Major-General in the army of exiles, an appointment James made with great reluctance. In addition to other acts of perceived insubordination, Sarsfield allegedly told William's negotiators at Limerick "change but kings with us, and we will fight it over again". After the planned invasion of England was abandoned in 1692, the exiles became part of the French army, and Sarsfield a French marechal de camp.

He fought at Steenkerque in August 1692, and was fatally wounded at the Battle of Landen in 1693, dying at Huy three days later. Despite several searches, no grave or burial record has been found, though a plaque at St Martin's church, Huy, has been set up in commemoration and an announcement in 2023 stated that, pending exhumation and identification, his remains had been located. Like much else, his reputed last words, "Oh that this had been shed for Ireland!", are apocryphal.

Legacy

Sarsfield left few contemporary records, and those that exist are "disconcertingly incomplete". It is impossible to determine his precise political views, almost nothing is known of his family life, and none of the alleged portraits of him can be authenticated. This allowed later writers to use him as a vehicle for their own needs, especially his portrayal as the "heroic ideal of an Irish soldier".

His success at Ballyneety remains his most famous achievement, although a 1995 study suggests it had limited military value, and his men may have indiscriminately slaughtered women and children. He has also been criticised for the role he played in creating divisions within the Jacobite camp; senior officers considered him rash and easily manipulated, although he seems to have been popular with the rank and file.

Mythologising began during his lifetime; the poet Dáibhí Ó Bruadair, 1625 to 1698, composed a panegyric describing Sarsfield as virtuous, heroic, popular and a great leader, but admitted they had not met. The anonymous song "Slán le Pádraig Sáirseál", or "Farewell to Patrick Sarsfield", is considered a classic of Irish-language poetry. Nineteenth-century nationalists like Thomas Davis celebrated him as a national hero and patriot, while in the early 20th century he was also depicted as a staunch Catholic. 

During the 1912 to 1914 Home Rule crisis, his image as a brave and honourable patriot was used to counter Unionist claims that Catholics, and by definition nationalists, were incapable of self-government. When the Irish Folklore Commission began collecting material in the 1930s, they recorded many oral narratives about Sarsfield, including stories of buried gold, generosity to the poor, having his horse shod backward to escape from pursuers, and apparitions of dogs or white horses.

The global Irish diaspora meant his name and reputation were commemorated beyond Ireland; Michael Corcoran, a Federal general in the US Civil War, claimed to be a direct descendant. From 1870 to 1880, a unit in the California National Guard formed from recruits of Irish descent was called the Sarsfield Grenadier Guards. Towns that bear his name include Sarsfield, Ontario,  and Sarsfield in Victoria, Australia.

"Sarsfield" appears on the coat of arms for County Limerick; in Limerick itself, there is a Sarsfield Bridge and Sarsfield Street, while the local Irish Army base is Sarsfield Barracks. An 1881 bronze statue by sculptor John Lawlor in the grounds of St John's cathedral. Part of the route used for the attack on the Williamite siege train is marked out today as Sarsfield's Ride, and is a popular walking and cycling route through County Tipperary, County Clare and County Limerick.

The song 'Jackets Green' by Michael Scanlan is about a soldier fighting alongside Patrick Sarsfield in the Williamite war.

Ancestry

References

Sources
 
 
 
 
 
 
 
 
 
 
 
 
 
 
 
 
 
 
 
 
 
 

1660s births
1693 deaths
Earls in the Jacobite peerage
Patrick
Irish generals
O'Moore family
Patrick
Wild Geese (soldiers)
Irish soldiers in the French Army
Irish soldiers in the army of James II of England
French military personnel of the Nine Years' War
Irish MPs 1689
Members of the Parliament of Ireland (pre-1801) for County Dublin constituencies
People from Lucan, Dublin
Irish military personnel killed in action